Hikmat Oktay oghlu Muradov (23 January 1969, Baku, Azerbaijan SSR - 29 October 1991, Xanabad, Khojaly, Azerbaijan) was the National Hero of Azerbaijan and warrior during the First Nagorno-Karabakh War.

Early life and education 
Muradov was born on 23 January 1969 in Baku, Azerbaijan SSR. From 1976 to 1986 he studied at the secondary school No. 190. That year he entered the Krasnokustk Civil Aviation School. After graduating in 1991 he was appointed a II pilot in An-2 plane in Yevlakh Aviation Company.

Family 
Muradov was single.

Nagorno Karabakh war 
When the First Nagorno-Karabakh War started, Muradov was assigned to the front line. Muradov carried out many flights to Nagorno-Karakabh with his AN-2 plane. He transported equipment, food and ammunition to Azerbaijani soldiers in Khojaly. On October 29, 1991, an AN-2 aircraft operated by Muradov was shot down by Armenian soldiers in Khanabad village of Khojali region returning from Khojali. As a result, the entire crew and all passengers on the plane were tragically killed.

Honors 
Hikmat Oktay oghlu Muradov was posthumously awarded the title of the "National Hero of Azerbaijan" by Presidential Decree No. 337 dated 25 November 1992.

He was buried at a Martyrs' Lane cemetery in Baku.

See also 
 First Nagorno-Karabakh War
 List of National Heroes of Azerbaijan
 Azerbaijani Air and Air Defence Force
 1992 Azerbaijani Mil Mi-8 shootdown

References

Sources 
Vüqar Əsgərov. "Azərbaycanın Milli Qəhrəmanları" (Yenidən işlənmiş II nəşr). Bakı: "Dərələyəz-M", 2010, səh. 214.

1969 births
1991 deaths
Military personnel from Baku
Azerbaijani military personnel of the Nagorno-Karabakh War
Azerbaijani military personnel killed in action
National Heroes of Azerbaijan